Wall Lake View Auburn Community School District was a school district in Iowa.

It had an elementary campus in Wall Lake and a High School/Middle School campus in Lake View. It also served Auburn.

Previously prekindergarten (bekindergarten) and 3-5 were in Wall Lake and K-2 were in Lake View. Middle school was in Wall Lake, and high school was in Lake View.

History

The Lake View-Auburn Community School District and the Wall Lake Community School District consolidated into the WLVA district on July 1, 1996.

In 2007 the WLVA district and the Sac Community School District, prior to their legal merger, had established a grade-sharing program in which each district sent students to the other district for certain educational levels; it was under the name "East Sac Schools." Barb Kruthoff, the superintendent of the Walled Lake View district, became the shared superintendent of the two districts, and remained so up until 2010, just prior to the merger, so a new individual could become the superintendent of the legally combined school system. On July 1, 2011, the two districts legally merged into the East Sac County Community School District.

References

External links
 
 

Education in Sac County, Iowa
Defunct school districts in Iowa
School districts established in 1996
1996 establishments in Iowa
School districts disestablished in 2011
2011 disestablishments in Iowa